This list of Argentine poets links birth and death years to corresponding "[year] in poetry" articles:

A
 Florencia Abbate (born 1976)
 Javier Adúriz (born 1948)
 Felipe Aldana (1922–1970)
 Carlos Alvarado-Larroucau (born 1964)
 Hilario Ascasubi (1807–1875)

B
 Enrique Banchs (1888–1968)
 Carlos Barbarito (born 1955)
 Martín del Barco Centenera (1535 – c. 1602) Spanish cleric, explorer, author and poet
 Nemer ibn el Barud (1925-??)
 Francisco Luis Bernárdez (1900–1978)
 Ivonne Bordelois (born 1934)
 Jorge Luis Borges (1889–1986)
 Delfina Bunge (1881-1952)

C
 Susana Calandrelli (1901–1978)
 Arturo Carrera (born 1948)
 Leonardo Castellani (1899–1981)
 Vicenta Castro Cambón
 Emeterio Cerro (1952–1986)
 Andrés Chabrillón (1882–1928)
 Claudio Mamerto Cuenca (1812–1852)
 Pascual Contursi (1888–1932)
 Gabino Coria Peñaloza (1881–1975)
 Humberto Costantini (1924–1987)
 Washington Cucurto (born 1973)

D
 Fernando Demaría (born 1928)
 Alejandro Dolina (born 1944)

E

F
 Ángel Faretta (born 1953)
 Jacobo Fijman (1898–1970)
 Juan de Dios Filiberto
 Jorge Fondebrider (born 1956)

G
 Gastón Gori
 Juan Gelman (born 1930)
 Joaquín Giannuzzi
 Oliverio Girondo
 Alberto Girri
 Eduardo González Lanuza
 Raúl González Tuñón
 Ricardo Güiraldes

H
 José Hernández (1834–1886)

J
 Roberto Juarroz (1925–1995)

L
 Ana Emilia Lahitte
 Leónidas Lamborghini
 Osvaldo Lamborghini
 Norah Lange
 Jorge Ángel Livraga Rizzi
 Francisco López Merino
 Esteban de Luca
 Leopoldo Lugones (1874–1938)

M
 Leopoldo Marechal (1900–1970)
 Carlos Mastronardi (1901–1976)
 Susana Molinari Leguizamón (born 1939)
 Ricardo Ernesto Montes i Bradley (1905–1976)

N
 Conrado Nalé Roxlo
 Andrés Neuman (born 1977)

O
 Rafael Obligado (1851–1920)
 Olga Orozco (1920–1999)
 Juan Laurentino Ortiz (1896–1978)

P
 Pedro Bonifacio Palacios (1854–1912)
 José Pedroni (1899–1968)
 Aldo Pellegrini (1903–1973)
 Néstor Perlongher (1949–1992)
 Ulyses Petit de Murat (1907–1983)
 Alejandra Pizarnik (1936–1972)
 Sixto Pondal Ríos (1907–1968)
 Antonio Porchia (1885–1978)

R
 José Rivera Indarte
 Mario Romero

S
 Roberto Jorge Santoro (1939–1977)
 Rafael Squirru (born 1925)
 Alfonsina Storni (1892–1938)

T
 María Dhialma Tiberti (1928–1987)
 Mario Trejo (born 1926)

U
 Paco Urondo (1930–1976)

V
 Alberto Vaccarezza
 Aurora Venturini
 Paulina Vinderman (born 1944)

W
 J. Rodolfo Wilcock (1919–1978)

Z

See also

 Argentine literature
 List of Argentine writers

Notes

Argentine
Poetsi